El Acompañamiento (English language:The Supporter) is a 1991 Argentine musical drama film directed and written by Carlos Orgambide. The musical was based on a play by Carlos Gorostiza.

Plot
The film is based on Tango music, an integral part of Argentine culture.

The 1991 film is an adaption of a play by the same name written by Carlos Gorostiza, one of the central figures in the Open Theatre movement of the early 1980s. The story revolves around the central character of Tuco, (portrayed by Carlos Carella) a singer who struggles to make his debut on television.

Release
The film debuted in Buenos Aires on 23 May 1991.

Cast
Carlos Carella as Tuco
Franklin Caicedo
Haydée Padilla
María Rosa Gallo
Ana María Giunta
Alberto Busaid
Oscar Viale
Enrique Liporace
Mónica Scapparone
Carlos Alberto Parrilla
Fernando Iglesias ("Tacholas")
Alicia Aresté
Enrique Mazza
María Silvia Varela
Carlos de Urquiza

Release
The film was released on 6 August 1992, in Spain, and was released later in Argentina.

Awards
 1992 Silver Condor Award for Best Adapted Screenplay

External links
 

1991 films
1990s Spanish-language films
1990s musical drama films
Tango films
Argentine musical drama films
1990s dance films
1991 drama films
1990s Argentine films